The Apollo is a historic storeship that is buried at a location in downtown San Francisco, California, at the site of the Old Federal Reserve Bank. It was listed on the National Register of Historic Places in 1991.  Parts of the ship have been uncovered, most recently in 1921 and 1925.  Photographs from the 1921 uncovering exist.  The 1925 excavation revealed coins from 1797, 1825, and 1840, a gold nugget, and assorted navigational pieces.  One of numerous buried ships within San Francisco, it is an archeological site, listed at least partially for its potential to yield information in the future.

References

Financial District, San Francisco
National Register of Historic Places in San Francisco
History of San Francisco
Shipwrecks on the National Register of Historic Places in California